The Committee on Indian Depredations was a standing committee of the United States Senate from 1893 to 1921. It superseded a select committee which operated from 1889 to 1893.

History 
The Committee on Indian Depredations was created by a Senate resolution on March 15, 1893, and superseded a select committee on Indian depredations that had been established in 1889 to deal with the increased volume of Indian depredation claims.  The committee oversaw claims under the Indian Depredation Act, which allows for citizen claims against the federal government for crimes committed by American Indians.  Many committee petitioners requested that claims for crimes committed during wartime be eligible for compensation, because the act limited claims to depredations committed in times of peace with the Indians.

The committee was terminated April 18, 1921, when the Senate eliminated this and several other obsolete standing and select committees.

Predecessor committees
Select Committee on Indian Depredations (18891893)

Chairmen
Gideon C. Moody (R-SD) 1889–1891
George L. Shoup (R-ID) 1891–1893
William Lindsay (D-KY) 1893-1895
John L. Wilson (R-WA) 1895–1899
William Deboe (R-KY) 1899–1901
Robert J. Gamble (R-SD) 1901–1903
J. Frank Allee (R-DE) 1903 – December 14, 1904 (appointed chairman of the Committee on Organization, Conduct, and Expenditures of the Executive Departments)
Charles Dick (R-OH) December 14, 1904December 18, 1905
Elmer J. Burkett (R-NE) December 18, 1905 – January 31, 1907 (appointed chairman of the Committee on Pacific Railroads)
Charles Curtis (R-KS) 1907–1911
Isidor Rayner (D-MD) 1911–1912
Robert Latham Owen (D-OK) 1912–1913
William Borah (R-ID) 1913–1917
Miles Poindexter (R-WA) 1917–1919
Henry L. Myers (D-MT) 1919–1921

References

Defunct committees of the United States Senate
Senate Committee on Indian Depredations